Tomasz Mędrzak (born December 18, 1954 in Łódź, Poland), was a teenage star of the 1973 In Desert and Wilderness movie and miniseries (1973), where he played Staś Tarkowski, having Monika Rosca as young partner. He is the son of Stefania Mędrzak.

He later did acting studies and has played a few movie roles. But he has always been focused rather on theatre. In 1996, he has been an art director of the Ochota Theater in Warsaw. He didn't really want to play Staś. He went to the auditions because he was interested in technical aspects of cinematography. Some time after being chosen, he wanted to decline, but the wife of the movie's director persuaded him to stay.

Filmography

References

External links
 
 
 

1954 births
Living people
Polish male actors
Polish male child actors